Guido Pulidori (born 23 March 1997) is an Italian professional footballer who plays for Livorno, as a goalkeeper.

Club career
He spent the 2016–17 season on loan at Serie D club Ligorna.

On 28 August 2018, he signed a two-year contract with the Serie C club Catania.

On 12 July 2019, he moved to Carrarese.

On 7 September 2021, he returned to newly reformed Livorno in Eccellenza.

References

1997 births
People from Empoli
Footballers from Tuscany
Living people
Italian footballers
U.S. Livorno 1915 players
Catania S.S.D. players
Carrarese Calcio players
Serie C players
Serie D players
Association football goalkeepers
Sportspeople from the Metropolitan City of Florence